Oak Center may refer to:

Places
United States
Oak Center, Minnesota, an unincorporated community
Oak Center, Wisconsin, an unincorporated community